Six ships of the Royal Navy have borne the name HMS Griper:

 was a gunvessel launched in 1797 and sold in 1802.
 was a 12-gun gun-brig launched in 1804 and wrecked in 1807.
 was a 12-gun gun-brig launched in 1813. She was used as a 2-gun discovery sloop in the Arctic from 1824, transferred to the Coastguard in 1836, used as a target from 1856 and was finally broken up in 1868.
 was an  wooden screw gunboat launched in 1855 and broken up in 1869.
 was an iron screw gunboat launched in 1879. She was used for harbour service from 1905 and renamed YC 373. She was made a base ship in 1923 and was renamed HMS Flora, and then HMS Afrikander in 1933. She was sold in 1937.
 was an  class rescue tug launched in 1942. She was sold to the Singapore Harbour Board in 1946 and renamed Surabaja in 1962.

Royal Navy ship names